Megaulacobothrus aethalinus is a species of slant-faced grasshopper in the family Acrididae. It is found in the Palearctic.

Subspecies
These subspecies belong to the species Megaulacobothrus aethalinus:
 Megaulacobothrus aethalinus aethalinus (Zubovski, 1899)
 Megaulacobothrus aethalinus kongausensis Caudell, 1928

References

Further reading

External links

 

Gomphocerinae